The People's Liberation Party-Front of Turkey (THKP-C) was a Turkish Marxist–Leninist guerrilla group It was founded in 1970 by Münir Ramazan Aktolga, Yusuf Küpeli and Mahir Çayan, with the People's Liberation Party of Turkey (THKP) being the political wing, and the People's Liberation Front of Turkey (THKC) being the armed wing.

Kidnapping of Ephraim Elrom 
On 17 May 1971, the THKC guerrillas Ulaş Bardakçı, Hüseyin Cevahir, Mahir Çayan, Necmi Demir, Oktay Etiman and Ziya Yılmaz kidnapped Israeli consul Ephraim Elrom. They left an announcement directed "to the Americanist Councile of Ministers" (Turkish: Amerikancı Bakanlar Kuruluna) written by Ulaş Bardakçı and Hüseyin Cevahir. After the Sledgehammer Operation, THKC guerrillas killed Ephraim Elrom on 22 May 1971. Elrom's body was found on the 23 May 1971 in the Hamarat Building, Nişantaşı, İstanbul. After the killing of the consul, the ethnic Zaza actor Yılmaz Güney hid the THKC guerrillas.

Sibel Erkan Affair 
The THKC guerrillas left Güney's house the 24 May 1971. On 30 May 1971 Çayan and Cevahir entered a house in Maltepe, İstanbul, and took Sibel Erkan as a hostage. The police and army initiated a rescue operation and had the house under siege for 51 hours. After, they attacked the guerrillas on 1 June 1971. Firstly sniper Cihangir Erdeniz directed 3 shots at Cevahir. After, the forces entered the house and killed Cevahir. Also Çayan was captured.

Trials and escape from prison 
After the arrest of THKP-C guerrillas, trials begun. Çayan and Bardakçı asked with execution. But on 29 November 1971, 2 THKO and 3 THKP-C guerillas escaped from prison.

Expulsion of Aktolga and Küpeli from THKP
After the escape Çayan meets with Münir Ramazan Aktolga and Yusuf Küpeli. After the meets, Çayan blamed Aktolga and Küpeli for being Doctorist. With proposal of Çayan, Aktolga and Küpeli exiled from THKP and THKC.

Fall of the Urban Guerrilla team 
After the escape Çayan and Bardakçı make a decision. Çayan beings leader of the rural guerrilla units and Bardakçı beings leader of the urban guerrilla units. On 19 February 1971 07:00, Bardakçı killed in Arnavutköy. With this, the urban guerrilla unit of the THKC was defeated.

Kızıldere Affair 
A Black Sea rural guerrilla team of the THKC and some THKO guerrillas, kidnapped 2 Canadian and 1 Briton radar technicians in Ünye on 26 March 1972. The revolutionaries were surrounded by Turkish soldiers in Tokat, Niksar, Kızıldere village on 30 March 1972. At first, the soldiers wanted to negotiate with the militants. Then the soldiers opened fire upon the militants, as result of which Mahir Çayan died. After the death of Çayan, the militants killed the technicians. And conflict starts. After the conflict, 9 guerrilla dead. Saffet Alp (from THKP-C) was captured. But after he was killed by soldiers. One of the guerrillas, Ertuğrul Kürkçü, hid and saved himself. But after he was captured on 31 March 1971. Because the father of Kürkçü couldn't  find his sons body amongst the dead.

See also 
Revolutionary People's Liberation Party/Front
Popular Front for the Liberation of Palestine
Democratic Front for the Liberation of Palestine

Footnotes

References

1970 establishments in Turkey
1972 disestablishments in Turkey
Banned communist parties
Banned political parties in Turkey
Defunct communist militant groups
Defunct communist parties in Turkey
Far-left politics in Turkey
Guerrilla organizations
Left-wing militant groups in Turkey